Energy Retail Company of Bashkortostan  is one of the largest electricity supply company Bashkiria.

References

External links
 
 Official website in Russian

Companies based in Ufa